Hypsirhynchus parvifrons, the common Hispaniolan racer, Cope's Antilles snake, or Hispaniolan black racer , is a species of snake in the family Colubridae.  The species is native to Haiti, the Dominican Republic, and the Bahamas.

References

Hypsirhynchus
Reptiles of Haiti
Reptiles of the Dominican Republic
Reptiles of the Bahamas
Taxa named by Edward Drinker Cope
Reptiles described in 1862